Aga Khan may refer to:

 Aga Khan, the hereditary title of the Imam (spiritual and general leader) of the Ismaili Nizārī Muslims
 Prem. Meghwar   

 (1804–1881), the first Aga Khan, and 46th Imam
 Aga Khan II (1830–1885), the second Aga Khan and 47th Imam
 Aga Khan III (1877–1957), the third Aga Khan and 48th Imam
 Aga Khan IV (b. 1936), the fourth and current Aga Khan and 49th Imam

Other people 

 Prince Sadruddin Aga Khan (1933–2003), United Nations High Commissioner for Refugees from 1966 to 1978
 Yasmin Aga Khan (b. 1949), American philanthropist known for raising public awareness in Alzheimer's disease

Other 

 Aga Khan Case, an 1866 court case
 Aga Khan Palace in Pune, India
 Aga Khan Development Network, whose subsidiaries include:
 Aga Khan Foundation (AKF)
 Aga Khan Health Services (AKHS)
 Aga Khan Hospital (disambiguation), any of eight medical institutions around the world, run by AKHS
 Aga Khan Agency for Microfinance (AKAM)
 The Aga Khan School, Dhaka
 Aga Khan Fund for Economic Development (AKFED)
 Aga Khan Planning and Building Services (AKPBS)
 Focus Humanitarian Assistance (FOCUS)
 Aga Khan Education Services (AKES)
 Aga Khan Trust for Culture (AKTC)
 Aga Khan Award for Architecture (AKAA), an architectural award established by the Aga Khan in 1977
 University of Central Asia (UCA)
 Aga Khan University (AKU), Pakistan's first private, autonomous university

fr:Aga Khan